Taglialatela is an Italian surname. Notable people with the surname include:

Giuseppe Taglialatela (born 1969), Italian footballer and coach
Linda Swartz Taglialatela (born 1949), American diplomat

Italian-language surnames